Crown Princess Minhoe of the Geumcheon Kang clan (Hangul: 민회빈 강씨, Hanja: 愍懷嬪 姜氏; 8 April 1611 - 30 April 1646), also known as Crown Princess Consort Sohyeon, was the wife of Crown Prince Sohyeon, the son of King Injo of Joseon and Queen Inyeol of the Cheongju Han clan.

Biography

Early life and marriage 
Lady Kang was born into the Geumcheon Kang clan to high-ranking state official, Kang Seok-gi, and his wife, Lady Shin of the Goryeong Shin clan (고령 신씨, 高靈 申氏) as their second daughter and seventh child on 8 April 1611.

In 1627, Lady Kang, aged 16, was chosen by the court as a consort to the Crown Prince Sohyeon, the son of King Injo and Queen Inryeol.

Palace conflict and death 
On 16 January 1636, the crown princess's mother-in-law died in Changgyeong Palace as she suffered from postpartum illness.

In December 1636, when the Qing invasions happened, the crown princess spent 8 years as a hostage in the Qing Dynasty with Crown Prince Sohyeon. During her time there, she birthed 3 daughters and 2 sons.

After she returned to Korea in 1644, she and her husband suffered from Injo's cold treatment. Her step mother-in-law, Queen Jangryeol, had also been receiving the same treatment due to Royal Consort Gwi-in Jo who succeeded in having her father-in-law hating the young Queen, and thus moved palaces.

The crown prince and princess were being treated as such because King Injo and his close administrators condemned Sohyeon's conduct as pro-Qing, and even though Prince Sohyun returned to Korea in 1645, his father King Injo persecuted him for attempting to modernize Korea by bringing in Catholicism and Western science.

Prince Sohyeon died suddenly not long after his return to Korea in 1645; he was found dead in the King's room, mysteriously bleeding severely from the head. Legends say that Injo killed his own son with an ink slab that the Crown Prince brought from China; however, some historians suggest he was poisoned by the fact that he had black spots all over his body after his death and that his body decomposed rapidly. Many, including Crown Princess Kang, tried to uncover what happened to the Crown Prince, but Injo ordered immediate burial and reduced the grandeur of the practice of Crown Prince's funeral. Prince Sohyeon's tomb is located in Goyang, Gyeonggi province, but King Injo never visited his son's tomb.

Afterwards, King Injo appointed Grand Prince Bongrim as the new Crown Prince (who later became King Hyojong) rather than Prince Sohyeon's oldest son, Prince Gyeongseon.

Gwi-in Jo, who was antagonistic toward the former crown princess, started to spread rumors that she was planning to poison the king. Without checking the authenticity of the rumor, the king ordered her death by poisoning as treason.

Aftermath 
Her misfortune, however, did not end there; her elderly mother and four brothers were executed by beating while her three young sons were banished to Jeju Island with two of them dying. Royal Consort Gwi-in of the Okcheon Jo clan was also the cause of Crown Princess Kang's husband's death. She was later given another name, Crown Princess Minhoe, whose Chinese characters mean “grudge and remorse.”

Her third youngest son, Prince Gyeongan, returned to the mainland alive and lived to the age of 21. Out of her five daughters, Princess Gyeongnyeong lived to the age of 40.

Titles 
 8 April 1611 - 1627: Lady Kang, daughter of Kang Seok-gi of the Geumcheon Kang clan (강씨, 姜氏)
 1627 - 1645: Her Highness, Crown Princess Consort Kang of Joseon (빈궁 강씨, 嬪宮 姜氏)
 Posthumous Title: Crown Princess Minhoe of Joseon (민회빈, 愍懷嬪)

Family
 Great-Great-Grandfather
 Kang Noe (강뇌, 姜賚)
 Great-Grandfather
 Kang Yu-gyeong (강유경, 姜惟慶)
 Grandfather
 Kang Chan (강찬, 姜燦)
 Adoptive grandfather: Kang Sun (강순, 姜焞)
 Grandmother
 Lady Kim of the Gwangsan Kim clan (광산 김씨); daughter of Kim Eun-hwi (김은휘, 金殷輝)
 Adoptive grandmother: Lady Kim of the Andong Kim clan (안동 김씨)
 Father
 Kang Seok-gi (강석기, 姜碩期) (23 March 1580 - 28 July 1643)
 Mother
 Shin Ye-ok (신예옥, 申禮玉), Lady Shin of the Goryeong Shin clan (고령 신씨, 高靈 申氏) (? - 1646)
 Grandfather: Shin Sik (신식, 申湜)
 Grandmother: No Chun-bok (노춘복, 盧春福), Lady No of the Gwangju No clan (광주 노씨, 光州 盧氏)
 Siblings
 Older brother: Kang Mun-seong (강문성, 姜文星)
 Sister-in-law: Lady Shin of the Pyeongsan Shin clan (평산 신씨)
 Niece: Lady Kang of the Geumcheon Kang clan (금천 강씨)
 Nephew-in-law: Yeo An-je (여안제, 呂顔齊)
 Niece: Lady Kang of the Geumcheon Kang clan (금천 강씨)
 Nephew-in-law: Kim Jin-su (김진수, 金震粹)
 Niece: Lady Kang of the Geumcheon Kang clan (금천 강씨)
 Nephew-in-law: Yeo Seong-je (여성제, 呂聖齊) (1625 - 1691)
 Grandnephew: Yeo Pil-seung (여필승, 呂必升)
 Grandniece: Lady Yeo of the Hamyang Yeo clan
 Grandnephew-in-law: Oh Su-ryang (오수량, 吳遂良)
 Great-grandnephew: Oh Myeong-hang (오명항, 吳命恒) (29 May 1673 - 12 October 1728)
 Older brother: Kang Mun-myeong (강문명, 姜文明)
 Sister-in-law: Lady Kim of the Andong Kim clan (안동 김씨, 安東 金氏)
 Older brother: Kang Mun-du (강문두, 姜文斗)
 Sister-in-law: Shin Sun-kang (신순강, 申順康), Lady Shin of the Pyeongsan Shin clan (평산 신씨) (1615 - ?)
 Older brother: Kang Mun-byeok (강문벽, 姜文璧)
 Older brother: Kang Mun-jeong (강문정, 姜文井)
 Older sister: Lady Kang of the Geumcheon Kang clan (금천 강씨)
 Brother-in-law: Jeong Tae-je (정태제, 鄭泰齊)
 Younger sister: Lady Kang of the Geumcheon Kang clan (금천 강씨)
 Brother-in-law: Yi Hong-sang (이홍상, 李弘相)
 Husband
 Crown Prince Sohyeon (5 February 1612 – 21 May 1645)
 Father-in-law - Injo of Joseon (7 December 1595 - 17 June 1649) (조선 인조) 
 Mother-in-law - Queen Inryeol of the Cheongju Han clan (인열왕후 한씨) (16 August 1594 – 16 January 1636) 
 Mother-in-law - Queen Jangryeol of the Yangju Jo clan (16 December 1624 – 20 September 1688) 
 Children
 Unnamed princess (군주, 郡主) (1629 - 1631); died young
 Unnamed princess (군주, 郡主) (1631 - 1640); died young
 Son - Yi Baek (이백), Prince Gyeongseon (경선군, 慶善君) or Prince Royal Yi Seok-cheol (원손 이석철, 元孫 李石鐵) (1636 - 1648)
 Adoptive grandson - Yi Yeob, Prince Imseong (임성군 엽) (1655 - ?); son of Yi Hoe, Prince Gyeongan (경안군 이회)
 Daughter - Princess Gyeongsuk (경숙군주, 慶淑郡主) (1637 - 1655)
 Son-in-law: Gu Bong-jang (구봉장, 具鳳章) (1638 - 1658)
 Grandson - Gu Jeong-sang (구정상, 具鼎相) (1653 - 1704)
 Great-Grandson - Gu Man-Seon (구만선, 具萬善) (1673 - 1723)
 Great-Grandson - Gu Man-hui (구만희, 具萬喜) (1677 - 1750)
 Great-Grandson - Gu Man-gil (구만길, 具萬吉) (1682 - 1706)
 Great-Granddaughter - Lady Gu of the Neungseong Gu clan (능성 구씨, 綾城 具氏)
 Great Grandson-in-law - Yi Seok-rok (이석록, 李錫祿)
 Great-Granddaughter - Lady Gu of the Neungseong Gu clan (능성 구씨, 綾城 具氏)
 Great Grandson-in-law - Yi Jin-geub (이진급, 李眞級)
 Son - Yi Seok-rin, Prince Gyeongwan (경완군 석린, 慶完君 石磷) (1640 - 1648); became the adoptive son of Yi Yo, Grand Prince Inpyeong (인평대군 이요)
 Adoptive grandson - Yi Hwan, Prince Yangwon (양원군 이환) (April 1658 - March 1724)
 Adoptive grandson - Yi Ui-jeo, Prince Imnyeong (증 임녕군 이의저) (12 February 1705 - 9 September 1779)
 Daughter - Princess Gyeongnyeong (경녕군주, 慶寧郡主) (1642 - 1682)
 Son-in-law: Park Tae-jeong (박태정, 朴泰定) of the Bannam Park clan (1640 - 1688)
 Grandson: Park Pil-myeong (박필명, 朴弼明) (1658 - 1716)
 Granddaughter-in-law - Lady Yi of the Hansan Yi clan (한산 이씨, 韓山 李氏)
 Grandson: Park Pil-yeong (박필영, 朴弼英) (1665 - 1715)
 Granddaughter-in-law - Lady Ahn of the Juksan Ahn clan (죽산 안씨, 竹山 安氏) (1664 - 1706)
 Granddaughter-in-law - Lady Yi of the Jeonju Yi clan (전주 이씨, 全州 李氏) (1687 - 1730)
 Grandson: Park Pil-hyeong (박필형, 朴弼亨) (1667 - 1696)
 Granddaughter-in-law - Lady Yi of the Byeokjin Yi clan (벽진 이씨, 碧珍 李氏)
 Granddaughter: Lady Park Yeong-hye (박영혜, 朴潁惠) (1670 - ?)
 Grandson-in-law - Yi Hui-nam (이희남, 李喜楠)
 Granddaughter: Lady Park Oh-hye (박오혜, 朴悟惠 ) (1671 - ?)
 Grandson-in-law - Yu Jeong-jin (유정진, 柳挺晉)
 Grandson: Park Pil-gwing (박필굉, 朴弼宏) (1675 - 1695)
 Granddaughter-in-law - Lady Yi of the Deoksu Yi clan (덕수 이씨, 德水 李氏)
 Granddaughter: Lady Park In-hye (박인혜, 朴仁惠) (1676 - 1729)
 Grandson-in-law - Yi Byeong-seong (이병성, 李秉成)
 Granddaughter: Lady Park Gyeong-hye (박경혜, 朴敬惠) (1677 - ?)
 Grandson-in-law - Kim Chi-gyeom (김치겸, 金致謙)
 Grandson: Park Pil-pyeong (박필평, 朴弼平) (1680 - 1697)
 Granddaughter-in-law - Lady Jeong of the Onyang Jeong clan (온양 정씨, 溫陽 鄭氏)
 Daughter - Yi Jeong-on, Princess Gyeongsun (경순군주 정온, 慶順郡主 正溫) (1643 - 1697)
 Son-in-law: Byeon Gwang-bo (변광보, 邊光輔) (1644 - 1661)
 Son - Yi Seok-gyeon or Yi Hoe (이회, 李檜), Prince Gyeongan (경안군 석견, 慶安君 石堅) (5 October 1644 - 22 October 1665)
 Daughter-in-law: Princess Consort Bunseong of the Gimhae Heo clan (분성군부인 김해 허씨, 盆城郡夫人 金海 許氏) (18 May 1645 - 5 June 1723)
 Grandson: Yi Hun, Prince Imchang (임창군 혼, 臨昌君 焜) (1663 - 29 February 1724)
 Granddaughter-in-law - Princess Consort Eungcheon of the Hamyang Park clan (응천군부인 함양 박씨) (? - 1721)
 Grandson: Yi Yeob, Prince Imseong (임성군 엽, 臨城君 熀) (1665 - ?)
 Granddaughter-in-law - Princess Consort Ikseong the Hong clan (익성현부인 홍씨)
 Unnamed son (왕손, 王孫) (1645 - 1645)

In popular culture
Portrayed by Lee Min-hee in the 1981 KBS1 TV Series Daemyeong.
Portrayed by Kim Ye-ryung in the 2005 EBS TV Series Yeoksa-geukjang.
Portrayed by Lee Sun-young in the 2007 KBS1 TV Series The Story of Korean History.
Portrayed by Yang So-min in the 2008 KBS2 TV Series Strongest Chil Woo.
Portrayed by Kim Ha-yoon in the 2010 KBS2 TV Series The Slave Hunters.
Portrayed by Kyung Soo-jin in the 2012 MBC TV Series The King's Doctor.
 Portrayed by Song Seon-mi in the 2013 JTBC TV series Blooded Palace: The War of Flowers
Portrayed by Seo Hyun-jin in the 2014 tvN TV Series The Three Musketeers.
Portrayed by Kim Hee-jung in the 2015 MBC TV Series Splendid Politics.
 Portrayed by Jo Yoon Seo in the 2022 movie The Owl.

References
 Comprehensive information system for people of all time-Min Hoe Bingang 역대인물종합정보 시스템-민회빈강씨
 https://koreajoongangdaily.joins.com/news/article/article.aspx?aid=2540771

Notes

1611 births
1646 deaths
Princesses of Joseon
House of Yi
17th-century Korean people
17th-century Korean women